Poodytes is a genus of passerine birds in the grassbird family Locustellidae.

A molecular phylogenetic study of the grassbird family Locustellidae published in 2018 found that some of the genera, as then defined, were non-monophyletic. In the resulting rearrangement to create monophyletic genera, five species were moved from Megalurus to the resurrected genus Poodytes. The genus had been introduced in 1851 by the German ornithologist Jean Cabanis to accommodate the little grassbird which is therefore the type species. The genus name combines the Ancient Greek poa meaning "grass" with dutēs meaning "diver".

The genus contains the following species:

 Fly River grassbird (Poodytes albolimbatus)
 Spinifexbird (Poodytes carteri)
 †Chatham fernbird (Poodytes rufescens)
 New Zealand fernbird (Poodytes punctatus)
 Little grassbird (Poodytes gramineus)

References

 
Bird genera